TheFlying disc event at the World Games 2009 in Kaohsiung was played between 19 and 21 July.

Ultimate is the only current event. The Ultimate tournament features just 6 teams.  The top 5 teams from the previous years World Ultimate Championships mixed division and the host country. The tournament was played with six players per side, with three women and three men on the field from each team.

Medalists

See also
 Flying disc at the World Games

References

 

2009 World Games